Aydie is a commune in the Pyrénées-Atlantiques department in the Nouvelle-Aquitaine region of south-western France.

Geography
Aydie is located some 40 km north-east of Pau and 15 km east of Garlin. The northern border of the commune is the departmental border between Pyrénées-Atlantiques and Gers and the eastern border is the border with Hautes-Pyrénées. Access to the commune is by the D292 road from Aubous to Arrosès which passes south through the west of the commune. The D317 branches off the D205 west of the commune and goes east through the commune to the village then continues east, changing to the D548 at the border, to join the D48. The commune is mainly farmland with scattered forests in the west.

The Sager river forms the eastern border of the commune as it flows north to join the Adour at Saint-Mont. Several streams rise in the west of the commune and flow east to join the Sager including the Boutigué which forms part of the northern border of the commune.

Places and Hamlets

 Aveillé
 Bardou
 Bayliot
 Boutigué
 Cau
 Caunille
 Le Château
 Curon
 Dabadie
 Estrémau
 Hardoy
 Jouandou
 Laforêt
 Lafosse
 Larribau
 Larrouy
 Laudique
 Lerp
 Maillet
 Marty
 Mondain
 Moulié
 Mourchette
 Moutha
 Parthonnaud
 Pellé
 Pessus
 Poey
 le Pucheu
 Saint-Martin
 Thillet

Neighbouring communes and villages

Toponymy
The commune name in béarnais is Aidia. Michel Grosclaude said that the name probably has a common root with Aydius but the origin and meaning of the name remains obscure.

The following table details the origins of the commune name and other names in the commune.

Sources:

Raymond: Topographic Dictionary of the Department of Basses-Pyrenees, 1863, on the page numbers indicated in the table. 
Grosclaude: Toponymic Dictionary of communes, Béarn, 2006 
Cassini: Cassini Map from 1750

Origins:

Census: Census of Béarn
Reformation: Reformation of Béarn
Establishments: Register of Establishments of Béarn

History
Paul Raymond noted on page 18 of his 1863 dictionary that in 1395 Aydie had 25 fires and Poey (Page 136) had 6 fires with both of them under the bailiwick of Lembeye.

Administration

List of Successive Mayors

Inter-communality
The commune is part of five inter-communal structures:
 the Communauté de communes des Luys en Béarn;
 the SIVU for roads in the Garlin region;
 the SIVU for the Lées and its tributaries;
 the Energy association of Pyrénées-Atlantiques;
 the inter-communal association for drinking water in Luy-Gabas-Lées;

Demography
In 2017 the commune had 140 inhabitants.

Economy
The commune is part of the appellation d'origine contrôlée (AOC) zones of Madiran (Red Madiran wine), Pacherenc-du-vic-bilh (White Madiran wine), and Béarn.

Culture and heritage

Civil heritage
The commune has many sites that are registered as historical monuments:

A Place at Poey (1567)
A Farmhouse at Curon (1778)
A Farmhouse at Moutha (1799)
A Farmhouse at Parthonnaud (18th century)
A Farmhouse at Mondain (1815)
The Maison Lescher Farmhouse at Pessus (19th century)
The Maison Lalanne Farmhouse at Lerp (19th century)
The Maison Jouet Farmhouse at Maillet (19th century)
The Maison Frouté Farmhouse at Dabadie (19th century)
A Farmhouse at Estrémau (1859)
A Farmhouse at Mourchette (1859)
A Farmhouse at Laudique (1759)
The Maison Moulié Farmhouse at Aveillé (1820)
Houses and Farms (18th to 19th centuries)
The Chateau Peyre (1895)
A Chateau (destroyed) (17th century)
A Fortified Building (12th century)
A Camp
A Camp at Pucheu (Prehistoric)

Religious heritage

The commune has three religious sites that are registered as historical monuments:
A Monumental Cross at Mondain (1888)
A Presbytery called House of little red pots (1848)
The Parish Church of Saint John the Baptist (11th century). The Church contains many items that are registered as historical objects:
A Statue: Virgin and Child (19th century)
An Altar, Retable, and Altar Cross (18th century)
6 Altar Candlesticks (18th century)
A Lighting Arm (18th century)
A Painting: Christ on the Cross with Saint John, the Virgin, and Madeleine (18th century)
A Retable (18th century)
6 Statuettes: Angel adoring, Saint Peter, Saint John, Saint Paul, and Saint Luke (18th century)
A Tabernacle (1725)
An Altar with Altar seating (18th century)
An Altar, Altar seating, Tabernacle, Retable, Lighting Arm, and 6 candlesticks (18th century)
A Monstrance (1868)
A Pill-box (18th century)
A Chalice with Paten (18th century)
2 Paintings: Baptism of Christ and Preaching in the Desert (18th century)
A Sideboard (19th century)
A Baptismal font (18th century)

Notable people linked to the commune
Joseph Peyré, born in 1892 at Aydie and died in 1968 at Cannes, was a French writer. He won the Prix Goncourt in 1935 for his book Sang et Lumières (Blood and Lights). He evoked his native village under the pseudonym of Saint-Jean-des-Vignes.

See also
Communes of the Pyrénées-Atlantiques department

References

External links

Aydie on the 1750 Cassini Map

Communes of Pyrénées-Atlantiques